Fort Halifax may refer to:

Fort Halifax (Maine)
Fort Halifax (Pennsylvania)